The 1967 Pacific typhoon season has no official bounds; it ran year-round in 1967, but most tropical cyclones tend to form in the northwestern Pacific Ocean between June and December. These dates conventionally delimit the period of each year when most tropical cyclones form in the northwestern Pacific Ocean.

The scope of this article is limited to the Pacific Ocean, north of the equator and west of the international date line. Storms that form east of the date line and north of the equator are called hurricanes; see 1967 Pacific hurricane season. Tropical Storms formed in the entire west pacific basin were assigned a name by the Joint Typhoon Warning Center. Tropical depressions in this basin have the "W" suffix added to their number. Tropical depressions that enter or form in the Philippine area of responsibility are assigned a name by the Philippine Atmospheric, Geophysical and Astronomical Services Administration or PAGASA. This can often result in the same storm having two names.

In 1967, the number of storms that the Japan Meteorological Agency considered "typhoons" was the record number (39).

Systems 

During the 1967 Pacific typhoon season, 40 tropical depressions formed, of which 35 became tropical storms. Twenty tropical storms attained typhoon intensity, and five of the typhoons reached super typhoon intensity.

Tropical Storm Ruby (Auring)

Typhoon Sally (Bebeng)

Severe Tropical Storm Therese

Typhoon Violet (Karing) 

Typhoon Violet, which formed on April 1, steadily weakened from its peak of 140 mph to directly impact northeastern Luzon as a 115 mph typhoon on the 8th. It dissipated in the South China Sea on April 12 without causing any significant damage.

Tropical Storm Wilda (Diding)

Typhoon Anita (Gening) 

Anita caused a plane crash in Hong Kong.

Typhoon Billie (Herming) 

Typhoon Billie, having developed on July 2, reached its peak of 85 mph on July 5. Billie's intensity fluctuated as it headed northward to Japan, and it became extratropical on the 8th; however, Billie's extratropical remnant continued northeastward, and it brought heavy rain to Honshū and Kyūshū, killing 347 people.

Typhoon Clara (Ising) 

A cold core low developed tropical characteristics and became Tropical Depression 8W on July 6. It tracked westward, becoming a tropical storm later that day and a typhoon on July 7. After briefly weakening to a tropical storm, Clara re-attained typhoon status, and it peaked in intensity on July 10, reaching winds of 115 mph. Clara weakened to a 90 mph typhoon just before hitting Taiwan on the 11th, and it dissipated over China the next day. Clara's heavy rains caused 69 fatalities and a further 32 people to be reported as missing.

Typhoon Dot

Typhoon Ellen

Severe Tropical Storm Fran (Mameng)

Severe Tropical Storm Georgia (Luding)

Severe Tropical Storm Hope

Tropical Depression Neneng

Tropical Depression 16W

Tropical Storm 17W

Tropical Storm Iris (Oniang)

Severe Tropical Storm Louise

Severe Tropical Storm Joan

Typhoon Kate (Pepang)

Typhoon Marge (Rosing)

Tropical Depression 23W

Typhoon Nora (Sisang)

Super Typhoon Opal 

Super Typhoon Opal was a powerful system that peaked in winds of 180 miles per hour (mph), the equivalent of a Category 5 hurricane.

Tropical Storm Patsy

Typhoon Ruth

Tropical Storm Thelma

Severe Tropical Storm Vera

Super Typhoon Sarah 

On September 14, Tropical Storm Sarah, which formed across the International Date Line, entered the Western Pacific. Immediately after the first advisory following Sarah's entrance into the West Pacific, it was upgraded to a minimal typhoon. Typhoon Sarah continued to intensify, and late on September 15, it was upgraded to a Category 4 typhoon. The next day, Sarah reached its peak intensity, attaining 150 mph winds and a 932 millibar (mbar) pressure reading (this was the only pressure measurement retrieved from the typhoon), making the system a super typhoon. Sarah began gradually weakening afterwards, and late on September 21, it became extratropical; it was still an 80 mph Category 1 typhoon at the time.

On September 16, Sarah made landfall on Wake Island at peak intensity, causing widespread damage. This typhoon was the third tropical cyclone since the beginning of observations in 1935 to bring typhoon-force winds to Wake Island, following an unnamed typhoon which struck on October 19, 1940 (Tomita, 1968), which brought 120 knot winds to the island, and Typhoon Olive in 1952, which lashed the island with 150 knot winds. Coincidentally, Olive's attack on the island occurred on September 16, exactly 15 years prior to Sarah's direct hit.

Typhoon Wanda

JMA Tropical Storm Twenty-nine

Typhoon Amy

JMA Tropical Storm Thirty-one

Tropical Depression 34W

Severe Tropical Storm Babe

Super Typhoon Carla (Trining) 

Carla became an intense typhoon while located in the Philippine Sea on October 15. During its weakening stage, the typhoon dumped extreme rainfall around its circulation. Baguio, Philippines recorded  of rainfall in a 24‑hour period between October 17 and October 18; however, Carla's precipitation was significantly more extreme in Taiwan, where  fell in a 48‑hour period between October 17 and October 19.
The worst typhoon to hit the country during the year, it killed 250 people and leaving 30 others missing.

Typhoon Dinah (Uring) 

Typhoon Dinah struck the southern island of Kyūshū in Japan, killing thirty-seven people and resulting in ten others being reported as missing.

Super Typhoon Emma (Welming) 
Typhoon Emma was the second super Typhoon to hit the Philippines just 2 weeks after Typhoon Carla. Typhoon Emma left 300 people dead and 60 others missing.

Typhoon Freda (Yayang)

Super Typhoon Gilda (Ading)

Typhoon Harriet

Severe Tropical Storm Ivy (Barang)

Storm names

International

Philippines 

The Philippine Atmospheric, Geophysical and Astronomical Services Administration uses its own naming scheme for tropical cyclones in their area of responsibility. PAGASA assigns names to tropical depressions that form within their area of responsibility and any tropical cyclone that might move into their area of responsibility. Should the list of names for a given year prove to be insufficient, names are taken from an auxiliary list, the first 6 of which are published each year before the season starts. The names not retired from this list will be used again in the 1971 season. This is the same list used for the 1963 season. The names Uring, Welming, Yayang, Ading and Barang used the first time (and only, in the case of Welming). PAGASA uses its own naming scheme that starts in the Filipino alphabet, with names of Filipino female names ending with "ng" (A, B, K, D, etc.).

Retirement 
Due to an extreme death toll caused by Typhoon Emma (Welming) in the Philippines, PAGASA later retired the name Welming and was replaced by Warling for the 1971 season.

See also 

 1967 Atlantic hurricane season
 1967 Pacific hurricane season
 List of wettest tropical cyclones
 Australian cyclone seasons: 1966–67, 1967–68
 South Pacific cyclone seasons: 1966–67, 1967–68
 South-West Indian Ocean cyclone seasons: 1966–67, 1967–68

References

External links 
 Japan Meteorological Agency
 Joint Typhoon Warning Center .
 China Meteorological Agency
 National Weather Service Guam
 Hong Kong Observatory
 Macau Meteorological Geophysical Services
 Korea Meteorological Agency
 Philippine Atmospheric, Geophysical and Astronomical Services Administration
 Taiwan Central Weather Bureau
 Digital Typhoon - Typhoon Images and Information
 Typhoon2000 Philippine typhoon website